The Spokane Public Library - North Monroe Branch is a historic building in the Emerson/Garfield neighborhood of Spokane, Washington. It was designed by Albert Held, and built in 1914 with $17,500 from Andrew Carnegie. It has been listed on the National Register of Historic Places since August 3, 1982.

References

Carnegie libraries in Washington (state)
Library buildings completed in 1914
Libraries on the National Register of Historic Places in Washington (state)
National Register of Historic Places in Spokane County, Washington